Kleblach-Lind is a town in the district of Spittal an der Drau in the Austrian state of Carinthia.

Geography
Kleblach-Lind lies on the east end of the upper Drau valley, about 10 km as the crow flies from Spittal an der Drau. The two towns are separated only by the Drau.

References

Cities and towns in Spittal an der Drau District